is a passenger railway station located in the city of Itako, Ibaraki Prefecture, Japan operated by the East Japan Railway Company (JR East).

Lines
Itako Station is served by the Kashima Line, and is located 5.2 km from the official starting point of the line at Katori Station.

Station layout
The station consists of one elevated island platform with the station building underneath. The station is staffed.

Platforms

History
Itako Station was opened on 20 August 1970. The station was absorbed into the JR East network upon the privatization of the Japanese National Railways (JNR) on 1 April 1987.

Passenger statistics
In fiscal 2019, the station was used by an average of 320 passengers daily (boarding passengers only).

Surrounding area
Itako Post Office

See also
 List of railway stations in Japan

References

External links

 JR East Station Information 

Railway stations in Ibaraki Prefecture
Kashima Line
Railway stations in Japan opened in 1970
Itako, Ibaraki